Waverley Province was an electorate of the Victorian Legislative Council. It existed as a two-member electorate from 1976 to 2006, with members holding alternating eight-year terms. It was a marginal seat for its entire existence, often changing parties according to who held government at the time. It was abolished from the 2006 state election in the wake of the Bracks Labor government's reform of the Legislative Council.

It was located in the south-east suburbs of Melbourne. In 2002, when it was last contested, it covered an area of 107 km2 and included the suburbs of Carnegie, Clayton, Glen Waverley, Mount Waverley, Mulgrave, Noble Park, Oakleigh and Springvale.

Members for Waverley Province

 Vliet died 16 October 1982

Election results

Former electoral provinces of Victoria (Australia)
1976 establishments in Australia
2006 disestablishments in Australia